Malnutrition in children is covered by multiple articles:

 Undernutrition in children
 Childhood obesity